Mindfulness-based cognitive therapy (MBCT) is an approach to psychotherapy that uses cognitive behavioral therapy (CBT) methods in collaboration with mindfulness meditative practices and similar psychological strategies. The origins to its conception and creation can be traced back to the traditional approaches from East Asian formative and functional medicine, philosophy and spirituality, birthed from the basic underlying tenets from classical Taoist, Buddhist and Traditional Chinese medical texts, doctrine and teachings.

Recently, mindfulness therapy has become of great interest to the scientific and medical community in the West, leading to the development of many new innovative approaches to mental health. One such approach is the relapse-prevention treatment for individuals with major depressive disorder (MDD). A focus on MDD and attention to negative thought processes such as false beliefs and rumination, distinguishes MBCT from other mindfulness-based therapies. Mindfulness-based stress reduction (MBSR), for example, is a more generalized program that also utilizes the practice of mindfulness. MBSR is a group-intervention program, like MBCT, that uses mindfulness to help improve the lives of individuals with chronic clinical ailments and high-stress.

CBT-inspired methods are used in MBCT, such as educating the participant about depression and the role that cognition plays within it. MBCT takes practices from CBT and applies aspects of mindfulness to the approach. One example would be "decentering", a focus on becoming aware of all incoming thoughts and feelings and accepting them, but not attaching or reacting to them. This process aims to aid an individual in disengaging from self-criticism, rumination, and dysphoric moods that can arise when reacting to negative thinking patterns.

Like CBT, MBCT functions on the etiological theory that when individuals who have historically had depression become distressed, they return to automatic cognitive processes that can trigger a depressive episode. The goal of MBCT is to interrupt these automatic processes and teach the participants to focus less on reacting to incoming stimuli, and instead accepting and observing them without judgment. Like MBSR, this mindfulness practice encourages the participant to notice when automatic processes are occurring and to alter their reaction to be more of a reflection. With regard to development, MBCT emphasizes awareness of thoughts, which helps individuals recognize negative thoughts that lead to rumination. It is theorized that this aspect of MBCT is responsible for the observed clinical outcomes.

Beyond the use of MBCT to reduce depressive symptoms, a meta-analysis done by Chiesa and Serretti (2014) supports the effectiveness of mindfulness meditation in reducing cravings for individuals with substance abuse issues. Addiction is known to involve interference with the prefrontal cortex, which ordinarily allows for delaying of immediate gratification for longer-term benefits by the limbic and paralimbic brain regions. The nucleus accumbens, together with the ventral tegmental area, constitutes the central link in the reward circuit. The nucleus accumbens is also one of the brain structures that is most closely involved in drug dependency. In an experiment with smokers, mindfulness meditation practiced over a two-week period totaling five hours of meditation decreased smoking by about 60% and reduced their cravings, even for those smokers who had no prior intentions to quit. Neuroimaging among those who practice mindfulness meditation reveals increased activity in the prefrontal cortex.

Background
The tradition of mindful cognitive learning has been an important part of Buddhist and Taoist practices and tradition for thousands of years in East Asia,  it is an important component of Traditional Chinese medicine and used extensively in Daoyin, Taiqi, Qigong and Wuxing heqidao as a therapy based on traditional intersectional medicine for prevention and treatment of mind and body disease, pain, and suffering.

In 1991, Philip Barnard and John Teasdale created a multilevel concept of the mind called "Interacting Cognitive Subsystems" (ICS). The ICS model is based on Barnard and Teasdale's concept that the mind has multiple modes that are responsible for receiving and processing new information cognitively and emotionally. This concept associates an individual's vulnerability to depression with the degree to which he/she relies on only one of the modes of mind, inadvertently blocking the other modes. The two main modes of mind are the "doing" mode and the "being" mode. The "doing" mode is also known as the "driven" mode. This mode is very goal-oriented and is triggered when the mind develops a discrepancy between how things are and how the mind wishes things to be. The second main mode of mind is the "being" mode. This mode is not focused on achieving specific goals; instead, the emphasis is on "accepting and allowing what is," without any immediate pressure to change it. The central component of ICS is metacognitive awareness: the ability to experience negative thoughts and feelings as mental events that pass through the mind, rather than as a part of the self. Individuals with high metacognitive awareness are able to avoid depression and negative thought patterns more easily during stressful life situations, in comparison with individuals with low metacognitive awareness. Meta-cognitive awareness is regularly reflected through an individual's ability to decenter. Decentering is the ability to perceive thoughts and feelings as both impermanent and objective occurrences in the mind.

In Barnard and Teasdale's (1991) model, mental health is related to an individual's ability to disengage from one mode or to easily move among the modes of mind. Individuals who are able to flexibly move between the modes of mind based on conditions in the environment are in the most favorable state. The ICS model theorizes that the "being" mode is the most likely mode of mind that will lead to lasting emotional changes. Therefore, to prevent relapse in depression, cognitive therapy must promote this mode. This led Teasdale to the creation of MBCT, which promotes the "being" mode.

This therapy was also created by Zindel Segal and Mark Williams and was partially based on the mindfulness-based stress reduction program, developed by Jon Kabat-Zinn. The theories behind mindfulness-based approaches to psychological issues function on the idea that being aware of things in the present, and not focusing on the past or the future, will allow the individual to be more apt to deal with current stressors and distressing feelings with a flexible and accepting mindset, rather than avoiding and, therefore, prolonging them.

Applications
The MBCT program is a group intervention that lasts eight weeks, or in eight sessions. During these eight weeks, there is a weekly course, which lasts two hours, and one day-long class after the fifth week. However, much of the practice is done outside class, with the participant using guided meditations and attempts to cultivate mindfulness in their daily lives.

MBCT prioritizes learning how to pay attention or concentrate with purpose, in each moment and, most importantly, without judgment. Through mindfulness, clients can recognize that holding onto some of these feelings is ineffective and mentally destructive. MBCT focuses on having individuals recognize and be aware of their feelings instead of focusing on changing feelings. Mindfulness is also thought by Fulton et al. to be useful for the therapists during therapy sessions.

MBCT is an intervention program developed to specifically target vulnerability to depressive relapse. Throughout the program, patients learn mind management skills leading to heightened meta-cognitive awareness, acceptance of negative thought patterns, and an ability to respond in skillful ways. During MBCT patients learn to decenter their negative thoughts and feelings, allowing the mind to move from an automatic thought pattern to conscious emotional processing. MBCT can be used as an alternative to maintenance antidepressant treatment, though it may be no more effective.

Although the primary purpose of MBCT is to prevent relapse in depressive symptomology, clinicians have been formulating ways in which MBCT can be used to treat physical symptoms of other diseases, such as diabetes and cancer. Clinicians are also discovering ways to use MBCT to treat the anxiety and weariness associated with these diseases.

Evaluation of effectiveness 
A meta-analysis by Jacob Piet and Esben Hougaard of the University of Aarhus, Denmark Research found that MBCT could be a viable option for individuals with MDD in preventing a relapse. Various studies have shown that it is most effective with individuals who have a history of at least three or more past episodes of MDD. Within that population, participants with life-event-triggered depressive episodes were least receptive to MBCT. According to a 2017 meta-analysis of 547 patients, mindfulness-based interventions support a 30-60% decrease in depressive and anxious symptoms, in addition to the overall level of patient stress.

An MBCT-based program offered by the Tees, Esk, and Wear Valleys NHS Foundation Trust showed that measures of psychological distress, risk of burnout, self-compassion, anxiety, worry, mental well-being, and compassion for others all showed significant improvements after completing the program. Research supports that MBCT results in increased self-reported mindfulness, which suggests increased present-moment awareness, decentering, and acceptance, in addition to decreased maladaptive cognitive processes such as judgment, reactivity, rumination, and thought suppression. Results of a 2017 meta-analysis highlight the importance of home practice and its relation to conducive outcomes for mindfulness-based interventions.

See also
 Buddhism and psychology
 Buddhist Meditation
 Neural mechanisms of mindfulness meditation
Mindfulness-based stress reduction
Mindfulness-based pain management
Full Catastrophe Living

References

Further reading
 Mindfulness-based cognitive therapy for depression: a new approach to preventing relapse, by Zindel V. Segal, J. Mark G. Williams, John D. Teasdale. Guilford Press, 2002. .
 Mindfulness: Finding Peace in a Frantic World by Professor Mark Williams & Dr Danny Penman Rodale Books US (October 25, 2011). Piatkus UK (5 May 2011)
 Mindfulness-based treatment approaches: clinician's guide to evidence base and applications, by Ruth A. Baer. Academic Press, 2006. .
 Mindfulness-Based Cognitive Therapy for Anxious Children: A Manual for Treating Childhood Anxiety, by Randye Semple, Jennifer Lee. New Harbinger Pubns Inc, 2010. .
 Mindfulness Practice in the Treatment of Traumatic Stress, U.S. Department of Veterans Affairs.
 id=Mindfulnet.org The independent mindfulness information resourceInformation on MBCT., MBSR Research, applications and resources

External links 
 Your Guide to Mindfulness-Based Cognitive Therapy, MBCT.com
 Mindfulness-based Cognitive Therapy
 Oxford Mindfulness Centre
 Mindfulness Meditation in daily life

Cognitive therapy
Cognitive behavioral therapy
Mindfulness (psychology)
Meditation
Concepts in the philosophy of mind